The  Denver Broncos season was the team's 32nd year in professional football and its 22nd as a member club in the National Football League (NFL). The team improved on its 5–11 from 1990, winning their third AFC West title in five years, and advanced to the AFC Championship game. Overall, the Denver Broncos had five players who were selected to participate in the Pro Bowl. Furthermore, this season also brought The Drive II in the divisional round of the playoffs.

Offseason

NFL Draft

Personnel

Staff

Roster

Regular season

Schedule

Note: Intra-division opponents are in bold text.

Postseason

Season summary

Week 1 vs Bengals

Week 2 at Raiders

Week 10

Standings

Playoffs

AFC Divisional Playoff

Trailing 24–23 with 2:07 left in the game, quarterback John Elway led the Broncos from their own 2-yard line to the winning 28-yard field goal with 16 seconds remaining. On the drive, he converted on two fourth downs. On fourth down and 6 from the Denver 28, he rushed for 7 yards. Then on fourth down and 10, he completed a 44-yard pass to wide receiver Vance Johnson.

The Oilers jumped to a 14–0 lead with quarterback Warren Moon's two touchdown passes to wide receivers Haywood Jeffires and Drew Hill for 15 and 9 yards, respectively. Elway then completed a 10-yard touchdown to Johnson, but kicker David Treadwell missed the extra point. Moon responded by throwing a 6-yard touchdown to wide receiver Curtis Duncan to give Houston a 21–6 lead, but Denver running back Greg Lewis scored a 1-yard touchdown before halftime. In the second half, the Oilers were limited to only a 25-yard field goal by kicker Al Del Greco, which gave Houston a 24–16 lead in the fourth quarter. The Broncos then marched 80 yards to score on Lewis' 1-yard touchdown run to cut the deficit to 24–23.

Elway's comeback is now known solely as The Drive II.

AFC Championship Game

Buffalo relied on missed field goals by Denver and some key plays from their defense to narrowly defeat the Broncos in a tough defensive struggle. Although the first half was scoreless, the Broncos advanced into Buffalo territory on all five of their possessions in the first half. However, Denver kicker David Treadwell missed 3 field goals, hitting the goal posts twice and driving the other attempt wide right.

Late in the third quarter, the Broncos faced second down and 10 at their own 19-yard line. Quarterback John Elway threw a middle screen pass intended for running back Steve Sewell, but it was tipped by Bills defensive lineman Jeff Wright into the arms of linebacker Carlton Bailey, who returned the ball 11 yards for Buffalo's only touchdown of the game. Elway was then knocked out of the game after suffering a deep thigh bruise, and was replaced by backup Gary Kubiak. With 4:18 left in the game, Buffalo kicker Scott Norwood made a 44-yard field goal to increase the lead, 10–0. Kubiak, who was playing in his last NFL game before retiring, led the Broncos 85 yards in eight plays and scored a 3-yard touchdown run with 1:43 left. Denver then recovered the ensuing onside kick, but the Bills clinched the victory after defensive back Kirby Jackson forced and recovered a fumble from running back Steve Sewell.

Broncos receiver Vance Johnson finished the game with 8 receptions for 104 yards. Kubiak completed 11 of 12 passes for 136 yards and rushed for 22.

Scoring
BUF – Bailey 11 interception return (Norwood kick) BUF 7–0
BUF – field goal Norwood 44 BUF 10–0
DEN – Kubiak 3 run (Treadwell kick) BUF 10–7

References

External links
Denver Broncos – 1991 media guide
 1991 Denver Broncos at Pro-Football-Reference.com

Denver Broncos
Denver Broncos seasons
AFC West championship seasons
Bronco